Zincirlikuyu is a quarter of the Şişli district on the European side of Istanbul, Turkey. Part of Esentepe neighborhood, it is situated on a hilltop on the district border to Beşiktaş in the east. Having undergone redevelopment in recent years, the area is also a busy bus hub.

Zincirlikuyu is known as a major junction, where Barbaros Boulevard coming from Beşiktaş meets Büyükdere Avenue in direction to Levent, and crosses over the motorway  connecting the Bosphorus Bridge with another important hub Mecidiyeköy.

Transport hub

Zincirlikuyu is a major bus interchange of the European site in Istanbul. It features bus stations in all four directions, to Levent, Mecidiyeköy and Beşiktaş as the first stop before the Bosphorus Bridge and the last one after the bridge for commuter bus traffic coming from the Asian side of the city. It is served by more than forty İETT city bus lines, and five of the eight metrobus lines, being the terminal of some.

The construction of the connections cost 40 million.

Cemetery

As Istanbul's one of the largest burial grounds, the Zincirlikuyu Cemetery, covers with its area of  most of the quarter. Planned in 1935 in a contemporary design in the then outskirt of the city, it reached in the 1950s its full capacity. The cemetery is known for holding the graves of many prominent figures from the world of politics, business, sports and arts. The headquarters of the Metropolitan Municipality's Cemetery Service is located also here.

Vocational high school for construction
The İSOV Vocational High School, a secondary educational institution for construction of built environment run by the Foundation of Istanbul Chamber of Industry (İSOV), neighbors to the south of Zincirlikuyu Cemetery. It was used in the beginnings as a summer hunting mansion by Yusuf Izzettin Efendi (1857-1916), the son of Sultan Abdülaziz (1830–1876) and the Crown Prince of the Ottoman Empire from 1909 until his death. Following his death, his family resided in the premises, which consisted of three buildings, for women (harem), men and guests and servants. From 1923 until 1939, the complex served as a primary school for orphans. It was then enlarged by new buildings, and converted into a vocational high school for the education of construction masters. In 2000, the high school's administration was transferred to the İSOV.

Zorlu Center

Opened in October 2013, the Zorlu Center is a complex of residential development, office space and shopping center with over 200 shops, 40 cafés and restaurants. It includes also the city's largest performing arts center.

References

External links

Quarters in Istanbul
Şişli
Transit centers in Istanbul
Istanbul Central Business District